The Cieszyn Vlachs are a Polish ethnographic group (subgroup of Silesians) living around the towns of Cieszyn and Skoczów, one of the four major ethnographic groups in Cieszyn Silesia, the one mostly associated with wearing Cieszyn folk costume but not the only one speaking Cieszyn Silesian dialect. The name, "Vlachs", is probably not directly associated with that group (as Gorals are) but was coined by adjacent groups as a nickname.

The culture of this group blossomed in the second half of the 19th century. The exact extent of its habitat is hard to determine due to overlapping of various cultural elements with adjacent groups, especially on the borderlands. Cieszyn Vlachs dwell on Silesian Foothills and on the north-western slopes of Silesian Beskids in the watershed of Vistula and Olza rivers, within Cieszyn Silesia (also in the Zaolzie region). Their neighbours include Silesian Lachs to north west, and Silesian Gorals to south.

Gallery

References

Cieszyn Silesia
Ethnic groups in the Czech Republic
Ethnic groups in Poland